Cheilosia nebulosa is a Palearctic species of hoverfly.

Description
External images
For terms see Morphology of Diptera
Wing length 6-8·5 mm. Face with conspicuous central knob. Legs partly yellow or orange. Scutellum without margin bristles. Wing with central cross veins darkened and with dusky clouds on anterior part. Antennae with third segment rounded and pale with dark tip.

Distribution
Present in most of Europe and the western Palearctic realm east to the Urals.

Biology
Habitat Wetlands, woodlands, Alnus and Salix carr and poorly drained scrub (Prunus spinosa). Flowers visited include Crataegus, Prunus, Salix, Taraxacum and Tussilago. Flies from the end of April to beginning June (later at higher altitudes).

References

Diptera of Europe
Eristalinae
Insects described in 1871